Banzare Coast, part of Wilkes Land, is that portion of the coast of Antarctica lying between Cape Southard, at 122°05′E, and Cape Morse, at 130°10′E. 

This coast was spotted by the US Exploring Expedition in Feb. 1840.

It was seen from the air by the British-Australian-New Zealand Antarctic Research Expedition, in 1930–1931, led by Douglas Mawson. The name by Mawson is an acronym of the expedition title.

References

 

Coasts of Antarctica
Landforms of Wilkes Land